The Primary 5 was a Scottish pop band from Glasgow, Scotland, formed in 2003 by former Teenage Fanclub and Soup Dragons drummer Paul Quinn. The name referred to the band being the fifth that Quinn has played in. The band's first album North Pole was self-released on Quinn's Bellbeat Music label.  They signed with Re-Action Recordings for the second album Go!. Allmusic's Matt Collar described the album as "A sparkling, sun-drenched blast of melodic guitar pop" and said it was "a superb album equal to its predecessor in every way -- and perhaps even a little better."

The third album, High Five, was recorded at Leeders Farm in Norwich and was engineered by Nick Brine, who had previously worked with Oasis and Bruce Springsteen, among others. High Five was released in 2008 on the Neon Tetra label. One critic compared the sound on High Five to The Byrds and Crosby, Stills, Nash & Young.

On 1 November 2010, Quinn released The Primary 5's retrospective, Revive - Demos & Rarities - 2001-2008, and announced that the band was officially defunct. The Primary 5 debut album, North Pole, had a 2017 re-release on vinyl via Sugarbush Records. The second release, Go!, had a 2017 re-release on vinyl via Spanish label Pretty Olivia Records. The third and final album, High Five, is currently being completely remixed and repackaged and was due for a vinyl release in 2019.

Discography
North Pole LP - Bellbeat Music - 2004
Go! LP - Re-Action Recordings - 2006
High Five LP - Neon Tetra Records - 2008
Revive - Demos & Rarities - 2001-2008 LP - (Self-released through Bandcamp.com) - 2010

References

External links
Primary 5 Bandcamp site

Scottish power pop groups
Scottish indie rock groups